A Divisão ( The Division) is a Brazilian crime drama web television series that premiered on the streaming service Globoplay on July 19, 2019.

The second season was released on September 10, 2020.

Plot
Set in the late 90s, the story accompanies the outbreak of kidnapping that shook the society of Rio de Janeiro and invaded the pages of newspapers in that decade. It then emerges a task force of the police from the Rio anti-kidnapping division, in order to combat the war between criminal factions.

Cast and characters
 Erom Cordeiro	as	Santiago - a corrupt, dishonest and intelligent investigator of the Civil Police of Rio de Janeiro and a member of the anti-kidnapping division. He's also Mendonça's biggest rival.
 Silvio Guindane as	Mendonça - an honest, serious, incorruptible and brutal delegate from the Civil Police of Rio de Janeiro and leader of the anti-kidnapping division. He's also Santiago's biggest rival.
 Thelmo Fernandes	as	Ramos - an investigator from the Civil Police of Rio de Janeiro and member of the anti-kidnapping division who, like Santiago, is also corrupt. He's also Santiago's best friend
 Natália Lage	as	Roberta - A Rio de Janeiro Civil Police investigator and member of the anti-kidnapping division who, who, like Santiago, is also corrupt. She's also Benicio's biggest rival.
 Marcos Palmeira	as	Benício - He is the leader of the Rio de Janeiro anti-kidnapping operation and Mendonça's boss. He's also Roberta biggest rival.
 Oscar Calixto	as	Wagner

Release

Marketing 
On 10 July 2019, the first trailer for the series was released.

References

External links 
 

2010s Brazilian television series
2019 Brazilian television series debuts
Brazilian crime television series
Brazilian drama television series
Brazilian thriller television series
Portuguese-language television shows
Television shows set in Rio de Janeiro (city)
Television series set in the 1990s
Television series set in 1997
Kidnapping in television
Globoplay original programming